Astroballe, or L'Astroballe is an indoor sports arena that is located in the Cusset neighborhood of Villeurbanne, Lyon, France. The arena is primarily used to host basketball games. The arena has a seating capacity of 5,556.

History
The arena opened in the year 1995, and has been used as the home venue of the top-tier level French Pro A League club ASVEL.

Access
The arena is accessible by the Laurent Bonnevay–Astroballe station, which is served by line A of the Lyon Metro and also by many bus and trolleybus lines.

References

External links
Astroballe 
Image 1 of Astroballe Interior
Image 2 of Astroballe Interior
Image 3 of Astroballe Interior

Basketball venues in France
Indoor arenas in France
Sports venues completed in 1995
1995 establishments in France
Sports venues in Lyon Metropolis